The Battle of Bapheus occurred on 27 July 1302, between a Ottoman army under Osman I and a Byzantine army under George Mouzalon. The battle ended in a crucial Ottoman victory, cementing the Ottoman state and heralding the final capture of Byzantine Bithynia by the Ottomans.

Strategic context 
Osman I had succeeded in the leadership of his clan in c. 1281, and over the next . two decades launched a series of ever-deeper raids into the Byzantine borderlands of Bithynia. By 1301, the Ottoman Turks were besieging Nicaea, the former imperial capital of the Byzantines, and harassing Prusa. The Turkish raids also threatened the port city of Nicomedia with famine, as Turkish warrior bands roamed the countryside and prohibited the collection of the harvest (see Akinji).

In the spring of 1302, Emperor Michael IX (r. 1294–1320) launched a campaign which reached south to Magnesia. The Turks, awed by his large army, avoided battle. Michael sought to confront them, but was dissuaded by his generals. The Turks, encouraged, resumed their raids, virtually isolating him at Magnesia. His army dissolved without battle, as the local troops left to defend their homes, and the Alans, too, left to rejoin their families in Thrace. Michael was forced to withdraw by the sea, followed by another wave of refugees.

Battle 
To counter the threat to Nicomedia, Michael's father, Andronikos II Palaiologos (r. 1282–1328), sent a Byzantine force of some 2,000 men (half of whom were recently hired Alan mercenaries), under the megas hetaireiarches, George Mouzalon, to cross over the Bosporus and relieve the city.

At the plain of Bapheus, an unidentified site (perhaps to the east of Nicomedia but within sight of the city) on 27 July 1302, the Byzantines met a Turkish army of some 5,000 light cavalry under Osman himself, composed of his own troops as well as allies from the Turkish tribes of Paphlagonia and the Maeander River area. The Turkish cavalry charged the Byzantines, whose Alan contingent did not participate in the battle. The Turks broke the Byzantine line, forcing George Mouzalon to withdraw into Nicomedia under the cover of the Alan force.

Aftermath 
Bapheus was the first major victory for the nascent Ottoman Beylik, and of major significance for its future expansion: the Byzantines effectively lost control of the countryside of Bithynia, withdrawing to their forts, which, isolated, fell one by one. The Byzantine defeat also sparked an exodus of the Christian population from the area into the European parts of the empire, further altering the region's demographic balance. Coupled with the defeat at Magnesia, which allowed the Turks to reach and establish themselves on the coasts of the Aegean Sea, Bapheus thus heralded the final loss of Asia Minor for Byzantium. According to Halil İnalcık, the battle allowed the Ottomans to achieve the characteristics and qualities of a state. The Ottoman conquest of Bithynia was nonetheless gradual, and the last Byzantine outpost there, Nicomedia, fell only in 1337.

After the victory, thousands of ghazis, who believed that the resistance of the Byzantine Empire had been broken, came in hordes from the interior of Anatolia to Bithynia to raid for spoils. Byzantine historian George Pachymeres indicated that the news had reached the ghazis in Paphlagonia and that the fame of Osman Ghazi had reached there. He writes that "now the threats came up to the gates of Constantinople and the Turks were wandering around freely in small groups on the other side of the Straits". There is not a single day that passes without hearing that the enemy is attacking the fortresses on the coast and taking people prisoners or killing them", Pachymeres reports.

Notes

Sources
 
 
 
 
 

Conflicts in 1302
1302 in Asia
1300s in the Byzantine Empire
1302 in the Ottoman Empire
Battles involving the Ottoman Empire
Battles involving the Byzantine Empire
Battles of the Byzantine–Ottoman wars
Battles in medieval Anatolia
History of Bursa Province
Byzantine Bithynia